The 2005–06 season is Grimsby Town's 128th season in their existence. They competed in Football League Two, alongside competing in the FA Cup, Football League Cup and the Football League Trophy. The season covers the period from 1 July 2005 to 30 June 2006.

Transfers

Transfers In

Loans In

Transfers Out

Loans Out

Fixtures and results
Grimsby Town's score shown first

Legend

Pre-season matches

Friendlies

Lincolnshire Cup

Football League Two

Playoffs

FA Cup

League Cup

Football League Trophy

League table
Carlisle United were another side who earned a second successive promotion, only two years after a relegation from the League that some predicted would see the end of the club. Northampton Town joined them, making up for two seasons of play-off disappointment, and Leyton Orient ended a decade in the bottom division by earning promotion on nearly the last minute of the season. Wycombe started the season with a 21-game unbeaten run that saw 5 of their players named in the PFA LG2 team of the year. Two tragic off the fields events however saw them fall away in the second part of the season before losing to Cheltenham Town in the playoff semi-finals. Grimsby Town lost 1–0 to Cheltenham in the final at the Millennium Stadium.

Rushden and Diamonds failed to improve on the previous season, and paid the price with relegation to the Conference. Oxford United joined them, despite the return of manager Jim Smith, and became the first former winners of a major trophy to be relegated to the Conference.

Coaching staff

Squad overview

First Team Squad

Appearances and goals

|}

Most frequent starting line-up

Most frequent starting line-up uses the team's most used formation: 4–4–2. The players used are those who have played the most games in each respective position, not necessarily who have played most games out of all the players.

Notes

References

2005–06
Grim